Tourism in India is important for the country's economy and is growing rapidly. The World Travel and Tourism Council calculated that tourism generated  or 5.8% of India's GDP and supported 32.1 million jobs in 2021. Even though, these numbers were lower than the pre-pandemic figures; the country's economy witnessed a significant growth in 2021 after the massive downturn during 2020. In October 2015, India's medical tourism sector was estimated to be worth US$3 billion, and it is projected to grow to US$7–8 billion by 2020. In 2014, 184,298 foreign patients travelled to India to seek medical treatment.

Over 17.9 million foreign tourists arrived in India in 2019 compared to 17.4 million in 2018, representing a growth of 3.5%. This makes India the 22nd most visited nation in the world and 8th in Asia and Pacific . Domestic tourist visits to all states and union territories numbered 1,036.35 million in 2012, an increase of 16.5% from 2011. In 2012, National Geographic's Traveller magazine named the state Kerala as one of the "ten paradises of the world" and "50 must see destinations of a lifetime". In 2014, Tamil Nadu, Maharashtra and Uttar Pradesh were the most popular states for tourists. Delhi, Mumbai, Chennai, Agra and Jaipur were the five most visited cities of India by foreign tourists during the year 2015. As of 2017, worldwide, Delhi is ranked 28th by the number of foreign tourist arrivals, while Mumbai is ranked 30th, Chennai 43rd, Agra 45th, Jaipur 52nd and Kolkata 90th.

The World Economic Forum's Travel and Tourism Development Index 2021, which replaced its previous Travel and Tourism Competitiveness Report, ranks India 54th out of 117 countries overall. The last edition of the Travel and Tourism Competitiveness Report, published in 2019, had ranked India 34th out of 140 countries overall. The report ranked the price competitiveness of India's tourism sector 13th out of 140 countries. It mentioned that India has quite good air transport infrastructure (ranked 33rd), particularly given the country's stage of development, and reasonable ground and port infrastructure (ranked 28th). The country also scored high on natural resources (ranked 14th), and cultural resources and business travel (ranked 8th). The World Tourism Organization reported that India's receipts from tourism during 2012 ranked 16th in the world, and 7th among Asian and Pacific countries.

The Ministry of Tourism designs national policies for the development and promotion of tourism. In the process, the Ministry consults and collaborates with other stakeholders in the sector including various central ministries/agencies, state governments, union territories and private sector representatives. Concerted efforts are being made to promote niche tourism products such as rural, cruise, medical and eco-tourism. The Ministry of Tourism maintains the Incredible India campaign focused on promoting tourism in India.

Visa policy of India

India requires citizens of most countries to hold a valid passport and apply for a travel visa at their local Indian embassy or consulate before their visit. Travellers can apply directly by mail or in person, or through their local travel services company. In 2014, India implemented an online method for citizens of 156 countries to apply for an e-Tourist Visa.

Nationals of Bhutan, Maldives, and Nepal do not require a travel visa to enter India. Citizens of Afghanistan, Argentina, Bangladesh, DPR Korea, Jamaica, Maldives, Mauritius, Mongolia, Nepal, South Africa and Uruguay are not required to pay a fee when obtaining an Indian visa.

A Protected Area Permit (PAP) is required to enter the states of Nagaland and Sikkim and some parts of the states of Arunachal Pradesh, Himachal Pradesh, Jammu and Kashmir, Manipur, Mizoram, Rajasthan and Uttarakhand. A Restricted Area Permit (RAP) is required to enter the Andaman and Nicobar Islands and parts of Sikkim. Special permits are needed to visit the Lakshadweep islands.

e-Tourist Visa 
As a measure to boost tourism, the Indian Government implemented a new visa policy in November 2014, allowing tourists and business visitors to obtain a "visa on arrival" at 28 international airports, by acquiring an Electronic Travel Authorisation (ETA) online before arrival, without having to visit an Indian consulate or visa centre. In April 2015, the "visa on arrival" scheme was renamed "e-Tourist Visa" (or "e-TV") to avoid confusion.

The e-Tourist Visa facility requires a tourist to apply online on a secure Government of India website, at least four to thirty days before the date of travel. If approved, the visitor must print and carry the approved visa with their travel documents. The visa allows holders of an ETA to enter and stay anywhere in India for a period of ninety days except for citizens of US, UK, Japan and Canada. Citizens of these countries can stay for up to 180 days at a time. an ETA can be obtained twice in a single calendar year.

India first introduced its "visa on arrival" facility on 27 November 2014, to citizens of the following countries: Australia, Brazil, Cambodia, Cook Islands, Djibouti, Fiji, Finland, Germany, Indonesia, Israel, Japan, Jordan, Kenya, Kiribati, Laos, Luxembourg, Marshall Islands, Mauritius, Mexico, Micronesia, Myanmar, Nauru, New Zealand, Niue, Norway, Oman, Palau, Palestine, Papua New Guinea, Philippines, Russia, Samoa, Singapore, Solomon Islands, South Korea, Thailand, Tonga, Tuvalu, UAE, Ukraine, USA, Vanuatu and Vietnam. On 30 July 2015, the facility was extended to China, Macau and Hong Kong. On 15 August 2015, the facility was further extended to citizens of Andorra, Argentina, Armenia, Aruba, Belgium, Bolivia, Colombia, Cuba, East Timor, Guatemala, Hungary, Ireland, Jamaica, Malta, Malaysia, Mongolia, Monaco, Mozambique, the Netherlands, Panama, Peru, Poland, Portugal, Seychelles, Slovenia, Spain, Sri Lanka, Saint Lucia, Saint Vincent and the Grenadines, Suriname, Sweden, Taiwan, Tanzania, Turks and Caicos Islands, the United Kingdom, Uruguay and Venezuela. The facility should eventually be expanded to about 180 countries.

As a result of the new visa policy, 56,477 tourists arrived on an e-Tourist Visa during October 2015, compared with 2,705 tourist arrivals during October 2014 (just before the facility was introduced), representing a 1987.9% increase. During the period from January to October 2015, a total of 258,182 tourists arrived on an e-Tourist Visa, a 1073.8% increase on the 21,995 tourist arrivals during the same period in 2014 (before the e-Tourist Visa was available).

Statistics

Foreign tourist arrivals and foreign exchange earnings

Foreign and domestic tourist visits by State

World Heritage Sites

There are 40 World Heritage Sites in India that are recognised by the United Nations Educational, Scientific and Cultural Organization (UNESCO) as of August 
2019. These are places of importance of cultural or natural heritage as described in the UNESCO World Heritage Convention, established in 1972.

Gallery
North India

Central India

West India

East India

South India

NorthEast India

Outline of Tourism in India

 Tourism in India by state
 List of World Heritage Sites in India
 List of National Geo-heritage Monuments in India
 List of national parks of India
 List of lakes of India
 List of waterfalls in India
 List of State Protected Monuments in India
 List of beaches in India
 Incredible India
 List of Geographical Indications in India
 Medical tourism in India
 List of botanical gardens in India
 List of hill stations in India
 List of gates in India
 List of zoos in India

 List of protected areas of India
 List of aquaria in India
 List of forts in India
 List of forests in India
 Buddhist pilgrimage sites in India
 Jain pilgrimage sites in India
 Hindu pilgrimage sites in India
 List of mosques in India
 List of rock-cut temples in India
 Wildlife sanctuaries of India
 List of rivers of India
 List of mountains in India
 List of ecoregions in India
 Coral reefs in India
 List of stadiums in India

See also

 Economy of India
 Aviation in India
 Fishing in India
 Tourism in India by state
 Aerial lift in India

References

Further reading
 Gupta, S. P., and Krishna Lal. 1974. Tourism, museums, and monuments in India. Delhi: Oriental Publishers.

External links

Ministry of Tourism, India
Visa on Arrival, Government of India
Gujarat Tourism Official, Government Website
Jammu & Kashmir Tourism Official Government website
Himachal Pradesh Tourism Official Government website
Punjab Tourism Official Government website
Haryana Tourism Official Government website
Delhi Tourism Official Government website
Rajasthan Tourism Official Government website
Uttar Pradesh Tourism , Government of India
Karnataka Tourism Official Government website
Madhya Pradesh Tourism Official Government website
Maharashtra Tourism Official Government website
Telangana Tourism Official, Government of India
Andhra Pradesh Tourism Official, Government of India
Temple Tourism, Temple Tourism of India

 Bradnock, Roma (2004). Footprint India Footprint Travel Guides, Bath, UK. .
 DeBruyn, Pippa; Bain, Keith; Venkatraman, Niloufer (2010). Frommer's India.
 

 
India